The Christ Building (also known as Harlan's General Store) is a historic commercial building located at 357-359 Sea Cliff Avenue in Sea Cliff, Nassau County, New York.

Description and history 
It was built in about 1880, and is a three-story, Second Empire style frame building. It has a hexagonal slate mansard roof and is clad with wood shingles. The building houses a store on the first floor and two rental units on the upper floors. The building was built during the period when Sea Cliff functioned as a Methodist camp and originally housed a bakery and store on the first floor and boarding rooms on the upper floors.

It was listed on the National Register of Historic Places on January 4, 2012.

References

Commercial buildings on the National Register of Historic Places in New York (state)
Second Empire architecture in New York (state)
Commercial buildings completed in 1880
Buildings and structures in Nassau County, New York
National Register of Historic Places in Nassau County, New York